Niketa Thopia (1388 – d. 1415) was the Lord of Krujë between 1392—1394 and 1403—1415. He was a member of the Thopia family and the son of Karl Topia, the Prince of Albania (r. 1368–1388).

Life
Niketa was the son of Karl Topia. His mother is unknown. Upon Karl Topia's death (1388), Marco Barbarigo inherited Krujë through his marriage with Helena, Niketa's older sister; Niketa's older brother Gjergj succeeded as Lord of Durazzo. Niketa held a territory south of Durazzo.

After the death of Bayezid (1402), many Albanian lords recognised Venetian suzerainty, such as Niketa, Gjon Kastrioti and Koja Zaharija. The Venetians were interested in having some buffer zone between them and the advancing Ottoman army. In 1403, Niketa Thopia managed to capture the city of Krujë from his sister, Helena Thopia, thus gaining another part of the territory previously held by the Thopia family.

His daughter Mara married Balsha III in 1407 and had a daughter Jelena, named after her grandmother Jelena Lazarević. Balsha III and Niketa entered an alliance in order to drive out the Venetians. Niketa then started to be a mediator between Balsha and Venetians during the First Scutari War. At the end of 1411, Niketa Thopia suffered a heavy defeat from the forces of Teodor III Muzaka during one skirmish. He himself was held prisoner and with the intervention of the Ragusan Republic was released, but only after conceding some territories around the Shkumbin river to the Muzaka family. Upon his death in 1415, the castle of Krujë fell into Ottomans' hands.

He married the daughter of Komnen Arianiti.

See also

Notes

Sources
 

14th-century rulers in Europe
Niketa
Year of birth unknown
1415 deaths
14th-century Albanian people
15th-century Albanian people